Thomas of Brotherton, 1st Earl of Norfolk (1 June 1300 – 4 August 1338), was the fifth son of King Edward I of England (1239–1307), and the eldest child by his second wife, Margaret of France, the daughter of King Philip III of France. He was, therefore, a younger half-brother of King Edward II (reigned 1307–1327) and a full brother of Edmund of Woodstock, 1st Earl of Kent. He occupied the office of Earl Marshal of England.

Early life
Thomas of Brotherton was born 1 June 1300 at the manor house at Brotherton, Yorkshire, while his mother was on her way to Cawood, where her confinement was scheduled to take place. According to Hilton, Margaret was staying at Pontefract Castle and was following a hunt when she went into labour. The chronicler William Rishanger records that during the difficult delivery his mother prayed, as was the custom at the time, to Thomas Becket, and Thomas of Brotherton was thus named after the saint and his place of birth.

King Edward I hastened to the queen and the newborn baby and had Thomas presented with two cradles. His brother Edmund of Woodstock was born in the year after that. They were overseen by wet nurses until they were six years old. Like their parents, they learned to play chess and ride horses. They were visited by nobles and their half-sister Mary of Woodstock, who was a nun. Their mother often accompanied their father on his campaigns to Scotland, but kept herself well-informed on their well-being.

Thomas's father died when he was 7 years old. Thomas's half-brother Edward, became king of England (Edward II) and Thomas was heir presumptive until his nephew, the future King Edward III, was born in 1312. The Earldom of Cornwall had been intended for Thomas, but his brother the King instead bestowed it upon his favourite, Piers Gaveston, in 1306. When Thomas was ten years old, King Edward II assigned to him and his brother Edmund, the estates of Roger Bigod, 5th Earl of Norfolk, who had died without heirs in 1306.

Career

In 1312, Thomas was titled Earl of Norfolk by Edward II, and on 10 February 1316, he was created Earl Marshal. While his brother was away fighting in Scotland, he was left Keeper of England. He was known for his hot and violent temper. He was one of the many victims of the unchecked greed of the king's new favourite, Hugh Despenser the Younger and his father Hugh Despenser the Elder, who stole some of the young earl's lands.

He allied himself with Queen Isabella and Roger Mortimer when they invaded England in 1326, and stood as one of the judges in the trials against both Despensers. When his nephew Edward III reached his majority and took the government into his own hands Thomas, who had helped with the deposition, became one of his principal advisors. It was in the capacity of Lord Marshal that he commanded the right wing of the English army at the Battle of Halidon Hill on 19 July 1333.

Thomas died on 4 August 1338, and was buried in the choir of the Abbey of Bury St Edmunds. As he had no surviving sons, Thomas was succeeded by his daughter, Margaret, as Countess of Norfolk. She was later created Duchess of Norfolk for life in 1397.

As a son of Edward I of England, Thomas was entitled to bear the coat of arms of the Kingdom of England, differenced by a label argent of three points.

Marriages and issue
Thomas married, firstly, before 8 January 1326, Alice de Hales (d. bef. 12 October 1330), daughter of Sir Roger de Hales of Hales Hall in Loddon in Roughton, Norfolk, a coroner, by his wife, Alice Skogan, by whom he had a son and two daughters:

Margaret, Duchess of Norfolk, who married firstly John Segrave, 4th Baron Segrave, and secondly Wauthier de Masny.
Edward of Norfolk, who married Beatrice Mortimer, daughter of Roger Mortimer, 1st Earl of March, but died without issue before 9 August 1334.
Alice of Norfolk, who married Edward Montagu, 1st Baron Montagu.

Thomas's wife Alice died by October 1330, when a chantry was founded for her soul in Bosham, Sussex.

Thomas married, secondly, before 4 April 1336, Mary de Brewes (died 11 June 1362), widow of Sir Ralph de Cobham (died 5 February 1326), and daughter of Sir Peter de Brewes (died before 7 February 1312) of Tetbury, Gloucestershire, by Agnes de Clifford (died before 1332), by whom he had no surviving issue.

Family

Ancestry

Family tree

Notes

References

Further reading
Mortimer, Ian. The Greatest Traitor, 2003.

1300 births
1338 deaths
1st Earl of Norfolk
Earls Marshal
Heirs to the English throne
House of Plantagenet
People of the Wars of Scottish Independence
13th-century English people
14th-century English nobility
Sons of kings
Children of Edward I of England